The 2018 EFL Cup Final (also known as the 2018 Carabao Cup Final for sponsorship reasons) was the final association football match of the 2017–18 EFL Cup that took place on 25 February 2018 at Wembley Stadium. It was the first League Cup final contested under the "Carabao Cup" name following the sponsorship of Carabao Energy Drink. It was contested between Manchester City and Arsenal, and won 3–0 by Manchester City. They would have entered the second qualifying round of the 2018–19 UEFA Europa League, but instead qualified  directly for the 2018–19 UEFA Champions League by finishing first in the 2017–18 Premier League.

The match was Manchester City's sixth League Cup Final, and their third in five seasons – qualification for the final also marked the first time Pep Guardiola reached a final with Manchester City. For Arsenal, the final was their eighth total in the competition, and their third of Arsène Wenger's managerial reign.

Route to the final

The EFL Cup is a cup competition open to clubs in the Premier League and English Football League. It is played on a knockout basis, with the exception of the semi-finals, which are contested over a two-legged tie.

Manchester City

Manchester City, a Premier League club involved in the UEFA Champions League, started their League Cup campaign in the third round, where they had been drawn away to fellow divisional opponents West Bromwich Albion. At The Hawthorns, winger Leroy Sané scored twice to give City a 2–1 victory. In the fourth round they faced Championship side Wolverhampton Wanderers at home. The visitors defended well and became the first team to keep a clean sheet against the Premier League leaders. Neither side scored after normal and extra time meaning the tie was decided by a penalty shoot-out. City progressed as 4–1 winners.

For the quarter-finals, Manchester City were drawn away to Leicester City at the King Power Stadium. Midfielder Bernardo Silva scored for the visitors, but deep into added time, striker Jamie Vardy equalised for Leicester from the penalty spot. The game finished 1–1 and much like the previous round City needed penalties to progress, winning the shoot-out 4–3. The semi-final pitted Manchester City against Championship side Bristol City. The first leg played at the Etihad Stadium saw the visitors take the lead towards the end of the first half, having been awarded a penalty that Bobby Reid converted. Kevin De Bruyne equalised for Manchester City and in injury time his teammate Sergio Agüero scored the winner to put the team firmly in control of the tie. Bristol City scored twice at Ashton Gate in the return leg, but Manchester City progressed to the final having won by three goals and recording a 5–3 aggregate score.

Arsenal

Arsenal, like Manchester City were involved in Europe (UEFA Europa League and entered the League Cup in the third round. They were drawn at home against Football League One side Doncaster Rovers. At the Emirates Stadium, Theo Walcott's goal in the 25th minute was enough to settle the outcome in favour of Arsenal. In the next round they faced Championship club Norwich City at home. Arsenal progressed with a 2–1 win after extra time after Eddie Nketiah was brought on as a substitute and scored his first two goals for the club.

Arsenal played against West Ham United in the quarter-finals, where at home they won 1–0 thanks to a goal from Danny Welbeck. The semi-finals pitted Arsenal against London rivals Chelsea. After a goalless first leg at Stamford Bridge, Arsenal progressed to the final after a 2–1 win at the Emirates Stadium due to an own goal from Chelsea's Antonio Rüdiger and a goal from Granit Xhaka. As a result, Arsenal reached the final without leaving London as four of their five games were at home, with the away leg of the semi final being played in London. Their tally of six goals on their way to the final represented the lowest goal-tally of any side to reach a League Cup final.

Match

Summary
In the 18th minute of the match Sergio Agüero opened the scoring when he ran in on goal and lobbed the ball over the advancing goalkeeper David Ospina with his right foot from the edge of the penalty area after an initial clash with Arsenal defender Shkodran Mustafi who appealed for a foul.

Vincent Kompany got the second in the 58th minute. A corner from the right by Kevin De Bruyne found İlkay Gündoğan on the edge of the penalty area, and his low shot was diverted into the net by Kompany with his left leg from seven yards out. David Silva got the third in the 65th minute when he shot low across and past the goalkeeper with his left foot from inside the left of the penalty area from seven yards out.

Details

See also
 2018 FA Cup Final

References

2018
League Cup Final
Cup Final
2018 sports events in London
Events at Wembley Stadium
EFL Cup
League Cup Final 2018
League Cup Final 2018